Bak Jong-cheol (April 1, 1965 – January 14, 1987) was a South Korean democracy movement activist.

Biography
In the 1980s, as president of the student council in the linguistics department of Seoul National University, he was one of activists in universities struggling against Chun Doo-hwan's dictatorship and the aftermath of the 1980 Gwangju Massacre.  Detained during an investigation into such activities, Park refused to confess the whereabouts of one of his fellow activists.  During the interrogation, authorities used waterboarding techniques to torture him, eventually leading to his death on 14 January.

Information surrounding the events of Bak Jong-cheol's death was initially suppressed. His death by torture helped spark the June Democracy Movement of 1987.

His death, including the events of its immediate aftermath, was subject of the movie 1987: When the Day Comes.

See also
June Struggle

References

External links
Martyr for Democracy Bak Jongcheol Memorial Association 

1964 births
1987 deaths
South Korean democracy activists
Korean torture victims
People from Busan
People executed by torture